Metaxya rostrata is a species of fern in the family Metaxyaceae native to the neotropics. It is characterized by its large fronds that are 1–2 m long.

Distribution
Metaxya rostrata can be found in all five natural regions of Colombia.

References

Cyatheales
Endangered plants
Neotropical realm flora
Flora of South America
Trees of Colombia